Warner Lake is a natural lake in South Dakota, in the United States.

Warner Lake bears the name of a pioneer settler.

See also
List of lakes in South Dakota

References

Lakes of South Dakota
Lakes of Codington County, South Dakota